Jirat Navasirisomboon (born 17 November 1996) is a Thai tennis player.

Navasirisomboon has a career high ATP singles ranking of 816 achieved on 31 October 2016. He also has a career high ATP doubles ranking of 1250 achieved on 3 July 2017.

Navasirisomboon represents Thailand in the Davis Cup. He defeated Kuwaiti tennis player Abdullah Maqdes in his first tie.

References

External links

1996 births
Living people
Jirat Navasirisomboon
Jirat Navasirisomboon
Southeast Asian Games medalists in tennis
Competitors at the 2017 Southeast Asian Games
Jirat Navasirisomboon